Jessica Scott is an American author of contemporary military romance, supernatural suspense, and nonfiction about soldiers returning from the Iraq War and War in Afghanistan.

Biography

Education 
She holds a PhD in Sociology from Duke University.

Military career 
Scott was a former Sergeant First Class before she commissioned at Officer Candidate School at Fort Benning.

Literary career 
Scott is the author of the Homefront series and the Falling series, both about soldiers and veterans adjusting to life after returning from the wars in Iraq and Afghanistan. Her bestselling Falling series features soldiers integrating into life on college campuses.

She has also written for the New York Times "At War" blog, PBS POV, and Iraq and Afghanistan Veterans of America.

Her debut novel Because of You launched the return of Random House's "Loveswept" digital imprint. She was featured as one of Esquire Magazines Americans of the Year for 2012.

Bibliography

Falling series 
 Before I Fall (2015)
 Break My Fall (2016)
 After I Fall (2017)
Until I Fall (2018)

Homefront series 
 Come Home to Me (2014)
 Homefront (2015)
 After the War (2015)
 Into the Fire (Previously Forged in Fire) (2015)

Coming Home series 
 I'll Be Home for Christmas (2013)
 Because of You (2011)
 Anything For You (2011)
 Back to You - Grand Central Forever (2014)
 Until There Was You - Loveswept (2012)
 All for You - Grand Central Forever (2014)
 It's Always Been You - Grand Central Forever (2014)

Supernatural suspense 
The Long Night (2016)

Nonfiction 
The Long Way Home: One Mom's Journey Home from War (2013)
To Iraq & Back: On War and Writing (2014)

References

External links
 Official Website
 Publishers Weekly Author's Page
 Goodreads Author's Page

Year of birth missing (living people)
Living people
American romantic fiction novelists
Women romantic fiction writers
Duke University alumni